Albert King (born December 17, 1959) is a retired American professional basketball player. The younger brother of former NBA scoring champion,  Hall of Famer Bernard King, Albert played at Fort Hamilton High School in Brooklyn and is regarded as one of the nation's greatest high school players of all time. He was rated the top prep player in the nation over Magic Johnson and Gene Banks during his senior year. A  guard-forward from the University of Maryland, King was selected by the New Jersey Nets in the first round (10th overall) of the 1981 NBA draft. King played in nine NBA seasons for four teams.

College career
In the 1979–80 college season, King was named the ACC Men's Basketball Player of the Year. He appeared on the cover of Sports Illustrated twice during the 1980 season. One of the highlights of his ACC career was a thundering dunk over Duke center Mike Gminski during a Maryland home game at Cole Field House. Duke was the first-seeded team in the nation at the time, and King went on to lead the Terrapins in scoring that night and helped defeat the Blue Devils 101–82. His no. 55 jersey was retired by the Maryland basketball program. In 2002, King was named to the ACC 50th Anniversary men's basketball team as one of the fifty greatest players in Atlantic Coast Conference history.

Professional career
King played in nine NBA seasons for four teams. He played for the New Jersey Nets, Philadelphia 76ers, San Antonio Spurs and Washington Bullets. King's best years as a professional came during his playing days with the Nets from 1981 to 1987. During the 1982–83 season, he appeared in 79 games and averaged 17.0 points per game and 3.7 assists per game. In his NBA career, he played in 534 games and scored a total of 6,470 points.

At the end of the 1988–89 season, he was signed by Olimpia Milano of the Italian Basketball League to replace Billy Martin. In Milan he played the last two games of the regular season and the following 12 of the postseason. Alongside some very experienced players such as Bob McAdoo, Mike D'Antoni and Dino Meneghin, he gave an essential contribution for winning the title in a very contested last game of the finals, scoring a season-high 22 points.

During the second half of the 1989–90 season, King played for Hapoel Holon of the Israeli Basketball League. In just 11 games he scored an average of 22.8 points per game including a 23-point game against Israeli powerhouse Maccabi Tel Aviv. The team finished the season in the seventh place and King left.

Personal life
He is the younger brother of former NBA scoring champion, Bernard King. They grew up in the Fort Greene neighborhood of Brooklyn.

He is also one of the central personalities in Rick Telander's acclaimed book Heaven is a Playground.

In the 1990s, he hosted Nets Slammin' Planet with Evan Roberts, Brandon Scoop B Robinson and Chris Carrino.

References

External links
 Albert King NBA stats at Basketball-Reference

1959 births
Living people
20th-century African-American sportspeople
21st-century African-American people
African-American basketball players
Albany Patroons players
All-American college men's basketball players
American expatriate basketball people in Italy
American men's basketball players
Basketball players from New York City
Fort Hamilton High School alumni
Maryland Terrapins men's basketball players
McDonald's High School All-Americans
New Jersey Nets announcers
New Jersey Nets draft picks
New Jersey Nets players
Parade High School All-Americans (boys' basketball)
People from Fort Greene, Brooklyn
Philadelphia 76ers players
San Antonio Spurs players
Shooting guards
Small forwards
Sportspeople from Brooklyn
Washington Bullets players